Otto Kaller (28 June 1907 – April 1985) was an Austrian international footballer.

References

1907 births
1985 deaths
Association football midfielders
Austrian footballers
Austria international footballers
First Vienna FC players